Terry Cook may refer to:

Terry Cook (archivist), archivist and scholar in archival studies
Terry Cook (racing driver), American stock car driver
Terry Cook (rugby league), Australian rugby league player
Terence Cook, Welsh rugby union and rugby league player

See also
Terry Cooke (born 1976), English footballer
Terry Cooke (footballer, born 1962)